The Washington Huskies men's basketball team represents the University of Washington in NCAA Division I college basketball competing in the Pac-12 Conference. Their home games are played at Hec Edmundson Pavilion, located in Seattle, and they are currently led by head coach Mike Hopkins.

Hec Edmundson Pavilion

Hec Edmundson Pavilion is the home for the Huskies men's and women's basketball teams, volleyball team and gymnastics squad. The 2020–21 season marks the 94th season of service for the multi-purpose facility. The facility was originally completed in December 1927. Wilson James Commissioning renovated the interior of Hec Edmundson Pavilion for $40 million. The renovation lasted 19 months between March 1999 and November 2000. The pavilion's name was also changed; originally slated to be "Seafirst Arena at Hec Edmundson Pavilion" when the deal was finalized in 1998, it became "Bank of America Arena at Hec Edmundson Pavilion" at the reopening, as Bank of America had retired the Seafirst brand in 1999. The ten-year sponsorship with the bank expired after the 2009–10 season and was not renewed; during the first half of the 2010–11 basketball season the venue was sponsorless and once again known simply as "Hec Edmundson Pavilion." On January 20, 2011, the university approved Seattle-based Alaska Airlines as the new sponsor of "Alaska Airlines Arena at Hec Edmundson Pavilion".

Postseason results

NCAA tournament results
Through 2020, the Huskies have appeared in 17 NCAA Tournaments, with an overall record of

NIT results
Through 2019, the Huskies have appeared in nine National Invitation Tournaments (NIT), with an 8–9 overall record.

 Conference rules (PCC/Pac-8) disallowed participation until 1973; UW's 1972 team

CBI results
Through 2019, the Huskies have appeared in one College Basketball Invitational (CBI), with a record of 0–1.

Results by season (2002–present)

The following are Washington's recent results.

{| class="wikitable"

|- style="text-align:center;"

Record vs. Pac-12 opponents

The Washington Huskies have the following all-time series records vs. Pac-12 opponents through the 2017–18 season.

Conference awards
Washington's conference award recipients as of 2019.

Coach of the Year

 1982 – Marv Harshman
 1984 – Marv Harshman
 1996 – Bob Bender
 2005 – Lorenzo Romar
 2009 – Lorenzo Romar
 2012 – Lorenzo Romar
 2018 – Mike Hopkins
 2019 – Mike Hopkins

Freshman of the Year

 1984 – Christian Welp
 1988 – Mike Hayward
 1992 – Mark Pope
 2009 – Isaiah Thomas
 2012 – Tony Wroten Jr.

Defensive Player of the Year

 2018 – Matisse Thybulle
 2019 – Matisse Thybulle

Conference Player of the Year

 1986 – Christian Welp
 2006 – Brandon Roy
 2019 – Jaylen Nowell

All-Century Team
Washington's All-Century basketball team was selected by a fan vote in 2002. Husky fans filled out ballots while attending games at Bank of America Arena or voted via the school's web site. Schrempf received the most votes followed by Todd MacCulloch and Bob Houbregs.
 Center Bruno Boin (1956–1957, 1959)
 Guard Chester Dorsey (1974–1977)
 Center James Edwards (1974–1977)
 Center Steve Hawes (1970–1972)
 Center Bob Houbregs (1951–1953)
 Forward George Irvine (1968–1970)
 Center Todd MacCulloch (1996–1999)
 Center Jack Nichols (1944, 1947–1948)
 Guard Eldridge Recasner (1987–1990)
 Forward Mark Sanford (1994–1997)
 Forward Detlef Schrempf (1982–1985)
 Center Christian Welp (1984–1987)

Former Huskies and NBA players
 Ralph Bishop (1933–1936) – competed in the 1936 Summer Olympics winning the Gold Medal.
 Jon Brockman (2005–2009) – Drafted 38th overall in the 2009 NBA draft by the Portland Trail Blazers. Played 3 seasons in the NBA (2009–2012) plus 4 seasons overseas.
 Marquese Chriss (2015–2016) – Drafted 8th overall in the 2016 NBA draft by the Sacramento Kings and traded on draft night to the Phoenix Suns. As of March 2022, Chriss plays for the Dallas Mavericks.
 Will Conroy (2001–2005) – Played professionally from 2005–2014. Current associate head coach at UW.
 Justin Dentmon, professional basketball player, 2010 top scorer in the Israel Basketball Premier League
 Charles Dudley (1970–1972) – averaged 5.3 points per game and won an NBA Championship with Golden State in 1975.
 James Edwards (1973–1977) – He retired with 14,862 career points and 6,004 career rebounds, 3x NBA Champion (1989, 1990, 1996)
 Markelle Fultz (2016–2017) – Drafted 1st overall in the 2017 NBA draft by the Philadelphia 76ers.
 Abdul Gaddy (born 1992), basketball player in the Israeli Basketball Premier League
 Pétur Guðmundsson (1977–1980) – Drafted 61st overall in the 1981 NBA draft by the Portland Trail Blazers.
 Lars Hansen (1972–1976) – 1x NBA Champion (1979), 2006 inductee to the Canada Basketball Hall Of Fame.
 Bill Hanson (1959–1962) – first Husky to lead the conference in rebounding.
 Spencer Hawes (2006–2007) – Drafted 10th overall in the 2007 NBA Draft. Played 10 seasons in the NBA (2007–2017).As of March 2020, he plays for the South Bay Lakers.
 Steve Hawes (1969–1972) – Drafted 24th in the 1972 NBA Draft. Played 10 seasons in the NBA (1974–84) plus three seasons overseas.
 Justin Holiday (2007–2011) – Undrafted in the 2011 NBA Draft, 1x NBA Champion (2015), As of March 2023, Holiday plays for the Dallas Mavericks
 Bob Houbregs (1950–1953) – career scoring average was 9.3 points per game, and he was elected to the Naismith Memorial Basketball Hall of Fame in 1987. In 2000, he was inducted into the Canadian Basketball Hall of Fame.
 Grant Leep (1999-2002) – Head men's basketball coach at Seattle Pacific University.
 Todd MacCulloch (1995–1999) – played 4 seasons in the NBA before retiring due to Charcot-Marie-Tooth disease.
 Jaden McDaniels (2019-2020) - Drafted 28th overall in the 2020 NBA draft by the Los Angeles Lakers.
 Dejounte Murray (2015–2016) – Drafted 29th overall in the 2016 NBA draft by the San Antonio Spurs.
 Jack Nichols (1943–1944, 1946–1948) –  He scored 5,245 points in his career and was a contributor to the Celtics' 1957 NBA Championship team.
 Louie Nelson (1970–1973) – Drafted 19th overall in the 1973 draft, played 7 years in the NBA.
 Jaylen Nowell (2017-19) - Drafted 43rd overall in the 2019 NBA draft by the Minnesota Timberwolves.
 Quincy Pondexter (2006–2010) – Drafted 26th overall in the 2010 NBA Draft, last played for the San Antonio Spurs in 2019.
 Eldridge Recasner (1987–90) – Played professionally from 1990–2002. Played in NBA with Denver (94–95),  Houston (95–96), Atlanta (96–98), Charlotte (98–01), LA Clippers (01–02).
 Nate Robinson (2002–2005) – 2006, 2009, 2010 NBA Slam Dunk Contest winner, last played for Homenetmen Beirut B.C.
 Lorenzo Romar (1978–1980) – Played five years in the NBA with Golden State, Milwaukee and Detroit. Head coach of the Huskies from 2002–2017.
 Terrence Ross (2010–2012) – Drafted 8th overall in the 2012 NBA draft by the Toronto Raptors. 2013 NBA Slam Dunk Contest winner.
 Brandon Roy (2002–2006) – 2007 NBA Rookie of the Year, 3x NBA All-Star. His NBA career ended in 2012 due to knee injuries. He played with the Portland Trail Blazers from 2006–2011 and the Minnesota Timberwolves in 2012.
 Mark Sanford (1994–1997) – 31st pick by the Miami Heat in the 1997 NBA Draft playing 3 years in the NBA. Sanford was the fastest freshman to score 500 points in school history doing so in only 32 games.
 Detlef Schrempf (1981–1985) – 3x NBA All-Star and 2x NBA Sixth Man of the Year.
 Isaiah Stewart (2019–2020) - Drafted 16th overall by the Portland Trail Blazers in the 2020 NBA draft.
 Isaiah Thomas (2008–2011) – Drafted 60th Overall in the 2011 NBA Draft, Thomas was an All Star in 2016 and 2017. As of December 2021, he most recently played for the Los Angeles Lakers.
 Christian Welp (1983–1987) – 1984 Pac-10 Freshman of the Year who became the Huskies all-time leading scorer and later entered the NBA.
 C.J. Wilcox (2010–2014) – Drafted 28th overall in the 2014 NBA draft by the Los Angeles Clippers.
 Tony Wroten (2011–2012) – Drafted 25th overall in the 2012 NBA draft by the Memphis Grizzlies. Wroten last played for Club Joventut Badalona.
 Phil Zevenbergen (1985–1987) – Played with the San Antonio Spurs for one season.
 Matisse Thybulle (2015–2019) – Drafted 20th overall in the 2019 NBA draft, he plays for the Philadelphia 76ers.

Retired numbers

In popular culture
The Huskies men's basketball team appears in the 1997 film The 6th Man with a fictional roster, of which are part the film's main characters, the brothers Kenny (Marlon Wayans) and Antoine Tyler (Kadeem Hardison). Much of the film was shot on location in Hec-Ed and around the actual campus.

References

External links